Cristian Montes López (born 10 August 1997) is a Spanish professional footballer who plays as an attacking midfielder.

Club career
Born in Tenerife, Montes graduated from the youth academy of Sporting de Gijón. On 7 February 2016, he made his debut for the reserves, coming on as a substitute of Cyril Dreyer in a 1–0 defeat against Racing de Ferrol. On 13 March, he scored his first goal for the club in a 2–1 victory over UD Logroñés.

In order to get more playing time, Montes joined CD Lealtad on a loan deal on 13 January 2017. On 12 July, he was loaned out to UP Langreo. He scored 25 goals during the season, which included hat-tricks against CD Mosconia, Club Siero and CD Colunga.

On 31 July 2018, Montes moved abroad and joined Cypriot First Division club AC Omonia on a three-year contract.

Career statistics

Club

References

External links

1997 births
Living people
Spanish footballers
Association football midfielders
People from Tenerife
Sportspeople from the Province of Santa Cruz de Tenerife
Segunda División B players
Tercera División players
Sporting de Gijón B players
CD Lealtad players
UP Langreo footballers
Cypriot First Division players
AC Omonia players
CF Badalona players
Spanish expatriate footballers
Expatriate footballers in Cyprus
Spanish expatriate sportspeople in Cyprus